Alistair Macdonald-Radcliff is an English Anglican priest known for his leadership of various organizations connected to international development and inter-faith dialogue as well as his commentary upon international affairs. Macdonald-Radcliff is the director general of the C1 World Dialogue, a group that has its origins in an initiative of the World Economic Forum.  Its president is former British Prime Minister Tony Blair.  He was formerly a senior advisor to Lord Carey of Clifton and to the King Abdullah Bin Aziz International Center for Interreligious and Intercultural Dialogue, and was also the Dean of All Saints' Cathedral in Cairo.

References

External links 
 Interfaith at the Vatican
 Report on Religion and Values
 World Economic Forum C100 Initiative Overview

Living people
English Anglicans
Yale University alumni
Alumni of the University of Oxford
Anglican clergy in the Middle East
Anglican deans in Africa
Year of birth missing (living people)